The discography of the English rock band the Stone Roses consists of two studio albums, six compilation albums, fifteen singles, one video album, and twelve music videos.

Albums

Studio albums

Live albums
 Stand Still (1991) (bootleg)

Compilation albums

Extended plays

Singles

Other certified releases

Videography

Music videos

Video albums

Live videos

Notes

References

External links
The Stone Roses
The Definitive Stone Roses Discography

Discography
Rock music group discographies
Discographies of British artists